The 2013 WAFF Beach Soccer Championship  was the first beach soccer championship for West Asia,  held from 1–5 May 2013, in Qeshm, Iran. Seven teams from the WAFF participated in the inaugural event.

Participants

 (hosts)

Group stage

Group A

Group B

Knockout stage

Semi-finals

Third-place

Final

Final standings

References

External links
  (Official Website)
http://www.the-waff.com/en/championships/24.html Retrieved 2015-04-22.
http://www.beachsoccer.com/events/waff-beach-soccer-championship-2013 Retrieved 2015-04-22.
 http://www.muscatdaily.com/Archive/Sports/Oman-finishes-runner-up-in-Iran-28nk Retrieved 2015-04-22.

WAFF Beach Soccer Championship
International association football competitions hosted by Iran
2013 in beach soccer